Puffins are stocky black-and-white pelagic seabirds in the genus Fratercula, covering some types of auk.

Puffin or Puffins may also refer to

Aircraft and missiles
 HMPAC Puffin, man-powered aircraft
 NASA Puffin, proposed single-seat proprotor.
 Parnall Puffin, experimental amphibious fighter-reconnaissance biplane.
 AUM-N-6 Puffin, an experimental American torpedo-carrying missile

Ships
 , a lightvessel assigned to the Daunt Rock station from 1887-1896
 , a Kingfisher-class sloop active 1936 to 1945
 , a coastal minesweeper active 1941 to 1944

Books and television
 Puffin Books, an imprint of Penguin Books specialising in children's literature
 Puffin Rock, a children's TV series from Northern Ireland
 Puffins (TV series), an animated television series

Other uses
 Puffin (currency), an unofficial unit of currency issued on Lundy
 Puffin Browser, a web browser for various computing platforms
 Puffin crossing, a road safety feature
 Puffin dog, a small dog breed of the Spitz type that originates from Norway
 Puffin Island (disambiguation)
 Puffin, a fictional character in The Swan Princess film series
 some of the butterflies in the genus Appias

See also 
 Puffin's Club, a private members' luncheon club established in the 1960s
 Puffinus, a genus of seabirds, covering some types of shearwaters